Sir Thomas Clavering, 7th Baronet (19 June 1719 – 14 October 1794) was a British landowner and Member of Parliament.

He was the son of Sir James Clavering, 6th Baronet and succeeded to the Baronetcy of Axwell and to the family estates on the death of his father in 1748.

He was Member of Parliament for St Mawes 1753–1754, and for Shaftesbury 1754–60 (where he paid £2000 to secure the seat). He resigned his seat at Shaftesbury in December 1760 to fight a by-election for County Durham; he lost that election and the general election of 1761, but was elected for the constituency at the third attempt in 1768 and continued to represent it until 1790.

Prior to his succession he lived at Greencroft Hall, Greencroft, Durham, a spacious mansion built by his grandfather James Clavering (1647–1721) in the late 17th century. In 1758, he replaced his father's old house Axwell House, near Blaydon on Tyne, with a new mansion house in Palladian style.

He had substantial mining interests including collieries at Beckley and Andrews House which between 1726 and 1747 were leased out to the Grand Allies partnership.

His marriage was childless and he was succeeded by his nephew, the future Sir Thomas Clavering, 8th Baronet (son of his brother George Clavering (1719–1794) of Greencroft).

Another brother was Lieutenant General Sir John Clavering (1722–1777) who was Commander-in-Chief, India 1774–1777.

References

Clavering, Sir Thomas, 7th Baronet
Clavering, Sir Thomas, 7th Baronet
Clavering, Sir Thomas, 7th Baronet
Clavering, Thomas
Members of the Parliament of Great Britain for constituencies in Cornwall
British MPs 1747–1754
British MPs 1754–1761
British MPs 1768–1774
British MPs 1774–1780
British MPs 1780–1784
British MPs 1784–1790